Victor Snell (1874–1931) was a Swiss journalist.

External links
 

1874 births
1931 deaths
Swiss journalists